Chiloé Province is one of the four provinces in the southern Chilean region of Los Lagos (X). It consists of all of Chiloé Archipelago (including Chiloé Island) with the exception of the Desertores Islands. Its capital is Castro, and the seat of the Roman Catholic bishopric is Ancud.

Administration
As a province, Chiloé is a second-level administrative division of Chile, governed by a provincial governor who is appointed by the president.

Communes

The province is composed of ten communes, each governed by a municipality consisting of an alcalde and municipal council.

Geography and demography
Of these, 82,058 (57.7%) lived in urban areas and 60,136 (42.3%) in rural areas. Between the 1992 and 2002 censuses, the population grew by 9.1% (11,805 persons).

References

.
Provinces of Los Lagos Region
Provinces of Chile